Vozuća is a settlement in Zavidovići municipality, Zenica-Doboj Canton in Bosnia and Herzegovina, located on the river of Krivaja. The settlement is known for the Battle for Vozuća of the Bosnian War, when the Army of Bosnia and Herzegovina defeated the Army of Republika Srpska. Today, Vozuća represents a symbol of the post-war recovery of Bosnia.

History 
In 1470, during the Ottoman rule, the settlement is first mentioned under the name "Kurtkasaba", meaning "wolf settlement" or "a place of wolves" in English. The local people changed it to "Vukovine" because the area's plentiful flora and fauna. In Vozuća are settled some places like Hrge, where in 1911 a spear and a bronze bracelet were found and are now in the collection of the National Museum of Bosnia and Herzegovina.

Southwest from Vozuća is Stog. Stog belongs to the local community of Vozuća. On one of the hills in Stog was placed the town of Maria Theresa known under the name Grad or Gradina. When Maria Theresia, it is told, was escaping from that town, she was throwing a golden loom into a vortex in the river of Krivaja. That vortex is known as the Deep vortex or Balukana (Turkish balk - fish).

From 1890 to 1963, the railway connecting Zavidovići and Olovo went through the settlement then known as Vukovine. In 1892, the name of the settlement changed from Vukovine to Vozuća (Bosnian "voz" - train).

Battle for Vozuća
The Battle for Vozuća was an attack on 10 September 1995 by the 3rd Corps of the Army of the Republic of Bosnia and Herzegovina against the strategically important village of Vozuća, held by rebel Bosnian Serb forces during the Bosnian War.

The attack started and ended on 10 September, with the total victory of the Bosnian forces. Due to their planning, they were ahead of the Serb forces. The Army got help from a special military force called the Black Swans.
The aftermath of the battle is infamous for the brutal behavior of some of the Mujahedin soldiers against remaining Serb soldiers and civilians. The Bosnian forces advanced through the Ozren area.

Geography 
Vozuća is located between the Kablovac hill from the right and Žedni Vrh from the left side of the river of Krivaja, with a large amount of arable land. Most of the people living in Vozuća are Bosniaks.

Demographics 
According to the 2013 census, its population was 805.

See also
 Vozuća Monastery

References

Populated places in Zavidovići
Bosnian War
Villages in the Federation of Bosnia and Herzegovina